Worm charming, worm grunting, and worm fiddling are methods of attracting earthworms from the ground. The activity is usually performed to collect bait for fishing but can also take the form of a competitive sport in areas such as the UK and East Texas. As a skill and profession worm charming is now very rare, with the art being passed through generations to ensure that it survives.

Methods

Most worm charming methods involve vibrating the soil, which encourages the worms to the surface. In 2008, researchers from Vanderbilt University claimed that the worms surface because the vibrations are similar to those produced by digging moles, which prey on earthworms. The same technique is used by many species of bird, which devour the worms as they appear above ground.

The activity is known by several different names and the apparatus and techniques vary significantly. "Worm grunting" generally refers to the use of a "stob", a wooden stake that is driven into the ground, and a "rooping iron" which is used to rub the stob. "Worm fiddling" also uses a wooden stake but utilises a dulled saw which is dragged along its top.

Techniques vary from sprinkling the turf with water, tea and beer, to music or just "twanging" with a garden fork. In some organized competitions, detergents and mechanical diggers have been banned.

Non-human animal behavior

Worm charming is a behavior also observed in animals other than humans, especially among birds. The methods used vary; however, tapping earth with feet to generate vibrations is widespread. One common example is the "Seagull dance". The wood turtle also seems to be adapted for worm charming, as it is known to stamp its feet – a behavior that attracts worms to the surface and allows the turtle to prey on them.

Soil conditions
Worms are most commonly found in damp or wet conditions and tend to move away from dry soil. The success of worm charming can often depend on these soil conditions, with charmers choosing damp locations or using water to attract the worms.

As a profession
Worms are sold as a live bait for fishermen, and many sellers use worm charming techniques to gather their stock. In some locations professional worm grunters need to obtain a permit in order to ply their trade.

Competitive worm charming
In most competitions, the fiddlers with the collector (or collectors) of the most worms in a set time are declared as the winners. They usually have a zone in which to perform their charming, measuring three yards square.

World Worm Charming Championship

One of the first worm charming events took place at an English school fête at Willaston County Primary School in Willaston, Cheshire. The World Worm Charming Championships started in 1980 and is now an annual event. It was organised by then-deputy headmaster John Bailey, who wrote the original rules for the competition. The event claims to have originated when in 1980 a local Willaston farmer's son Tom Shufflebotham charmed 511 worms in half an hour.

The current world record was established on 29 June 2009, by 10-year-old Sophie Smith of Willaston, England, who raised 567 worms during Britain's World Worm Charming Championship.

There are 18 rules of this event as determined by the International Federation of Charming Worms and Allied Pastimes (IFCWAP). These stipulate that each competitor operates within a 3 x 3 metre plot, may only use vibrations or music to attract worms, is not allowed to dig or use "drugs" to attract worms (including water or other liquids), may stick a garden fork into the ground and vibrate it to encourage worms and all worms must be returned to the ground once the birds have gone to roost on the evening of the event. This is to prevent a "feast" for the birds after the event.

The competition returned in 2022, after missing 2020 and 2021 due to  COVID-19.

Devon Worm Charming Festival
Also known as the International Festival of Worm Charming, this event takes place in the small village of Blackawton, South Devon, during the early May Bank Holiday. It has been running since 1984 and is accompanied by a Real Ale Beer Festival and other activities. The genesis of the event occurred in 1983, when Dave Kelland after returning home from drinking at The Normandy Arms relieved himself in a field and was surprised to see worms come to the surface giving him inspiration for the competition. The event has been held at The Normandy Arms ever since. Unlike the World Worm Charming Championships at Cheshire, "forking" the ground is not allowed however the use of water is.

Cornwall Worm Charming Championships
A new world charming championship was established in 2021 by local artist Georgia Gendall with the inaugural competition held in Penryn. However, the event in 2022 in Falmouth demonstrated the effects of climate change on Worm Charming with a heat wave leading to only a single worm being charmed.

Canadian Worm Charming Championship and Festival
The Great Canadian Worm Charming Championship and Festival Canadian Competition was held at the Shelburne Fiddle Park in Shelburne, Ontario, on June 9, 2012.

American Worm Gruntin' Festival
The town of Sopchoppy, Florida, has held an annual "Worm Gruntin' Festival" since 2000. The event includes a ball and the crowning of a "Worm Gruntin' King and Queen". Sopchoppy is one of the settings and worm grunting a plot element in the 2017 novel Clownfish Blues by Tim Dorsey.

References

External links
Associated Press video demonstrating worm grunting
The World Worm Charming Championship
Worm grunting mystery solved

Recreational fishing
Animals in sport
Articles containing video clips
Worms (obsolete taxon)
Annelids